Ger (Ger is the Mongolian word for home and also for the traditional tent dwelling) was an online magazine launched in Mongolia in the late 1990s. The country's first online magazine, Ger became a much-cited source on the effects of the transition to free markets and democracy the country experienced throughout the 1990s.

Overview
Ger was launched on September 9, 1998. The theme of youth in the transition was explored by a combined team of Mongolian and foreign journalists. The Ger Magazine project had basically three goals: first, raise the quality of journalism in the country, secondly, introduce the country to a wider global audience and, by being the country’s first online magazine, prove the internet was an effective way to communicate.  Stories tackled the struggle to find work in the free market, the booming pop music scene and how it is leading the way in business entrepreneurship, reproductive health, the basics on Mongolian culture, and vox pop views from Mongolian youth.

Issue 2 of the magazine investigated modern life in Mongolia during transition. Stories probed the proliferation of bars and the problem of alcoholism, corrupt banking practices and the loss of savings, how the young were the country's leading entrepreneurs, Mongolia's meat and milk diet, "girl power" and the strong role played by women, the burgeoning new media, the rise and rise of Buddhism, and Mongolia's dynamic fashion designers (this article inspired foreign fashion designers to embrace the Mongolian "look" in the next season's designs).

An online survey of the state of Mongolia's media and its history (http://www.pressreference.com/Ma-No/Mongolia.html), had this to say: "An interesting variation from some of the other publications available is Ger Magazine (published online with guidance from the United Nations Development Program, UNDP), which is concerned with Mongolian youth in cultural transition. The name of the magazine is meant to be ironic because a ger is the Mongolian word for yurt—a yurt being traditional nomadic housing—but the magazine is about urbanization and globalization of Mongolian youth."

Staff
 Editor-in-chief: David South (1998-1999)
 Logo design: P. Davaa-Ochir

Further reading
 Jill Lawless, Wild East: Travels in the New Mongolia (ECW Press, Toronto, 2000)
 Morris Rossabi, Modern Mongolia: From Khans to Commissars to Capitalists (University of California Press, Berkeley and Los Angeles, California, 2005)
 David South and Julie Schneiderman, In Their Own Words: Selected Writings by Journalists on Mongolia, 1997-1999 (UNDP Mongolia, Ulaanbaatar, Mongolia, 1999)

External links
 "Ger, Mongolia's first web magazine and a pioneering project for the United Nations" - Blog, David South Consulting, 12 January 2016  (retrieved 3 July 2017)
Nations in Transition: Mongolia by Jennifer L. Hanson (2004)
Ger - online magazine on contemporary Mongolia
Mongolia Links
Press Reference
Wild East: Travels in the New Mongolia
What is a Ger? And other Mongolian cultural traditions
Mongolian Food: Meat, Milk and Mongolia by N. Oyunbayar
 Information Rich, Information Poor: The Cost of Communication, BBC News Online, Kate Milner (1999)

Online magazines
Mass media companies of Mongolia
Magazines established in 1998
Cultural magazines
Magazines with year of disestablishment missing

1998 in Mongolia
1999 in Mongolia